Club Atlético Platense  is a football club from Montevideo in Uruguay. It currently plays in the Uruguayan 2nd Amateur Division, the third tier of uruguayan championship.

Platense won the 2005/2006 Liga Metropolitana Amateur, commonly known as 3rd division, to gain promotion.

Played some years of the 1990 decade as Platense Wanderers.

Titles
 Uruguayan Segunda División Amateur (3): 1981, 1994, 2005

References

External links

Platense
Platense
1935 establishments in Uruguay